Michael Connolly (born 19 June 1954 in Castlegar, County Galway) is an Irish former sportsperson. He played hurling with his local club Castlegar and was a member of the Galway and London senior inter-county teams from the 1970s until the 1990s.

References

 

1954 births
Living people
Castlegar hurlers
Galway inter-county hurlers
Irish carpenters
London inter-county hurlers
Connacht inter-provincial hurlers
All-Ireland Senior Hurling Championship winners